Giuseppe Perentin (21 February 1906 – 4 March 1981) was an Italian freestyle swimmer who competed in the 1928 Summer Olympics and in the 1932 Summer Olympics.

Perentin was born in Izola, Austria-Hungary. In 1928 he was eliminated in the semi-finals of the 1500 metre freestyle event. He was also a member of the Italian relay team which was eliminated in the first round of the 4×200 metre freestyle relay competition.

Four years later he was eliminated in the semi-finals of the 400 metre freestyle event as well as in the first round of the 1500 metre freestyle competition.

External links

1906 births
1981 deaths
Italian male swimmers
Olympic swimmers of Italy
Swimmers at the 1928 Summer Olympics
Swimmers at the 1932 Summer Olympics
People from Izola
European Aquatics Championships medalists in swimming